Several naval ships of Germany were named Schleswig-Holstein after the federal state of  Schleswig-Holstein:

  (battleship):  13,000-ton , launched 1906
 :  (Type 101A) destroyer, scrapped 1998
 :  (Type 123) frigate

German Navy ship names